Pachyta is a genus of beetles in the family Cerambycidae.

Subgenera and species
 Fairmairia Podaný, 1964 
 Pachyta oxyoma  Fairmaire, 1889
 Pachyta Dejean, 1821
 Pachyta armata LeConte, 1873
 Pachyta bicuneata Motschulsky, 1860
 Pachyta degener  Semenov & Plavilstshikov, 1936 
 Pachyta erebia  Bates, 1884 
 Pachyta felix  Holzschuh, 2007 
 Pachyta gorodinskii  Rapuzzi, 2013 
 Pachyta lamed (Linnaeus, 1758)
 Pachyta mediofasciata  Pic, 1936 
 Pachyta perlata  Holzschuh, 1991 
 Pachyta quadrimaculata  (Linnaeus, 1758)

References

Lepturinae